Donald William Macdonald (died 12 June 1994) was an Australian rugby league referee and administrator.

Career
Macdonald began his refereeing career in the Newtown District Junior Rugby League. He was subsequently graded to referee in the New South Wales Rugby League (NSWRL) in 1963, gaining his first first-grade match in 1967. He went on to control over 150 top grade matches in a career that lasted until 1979.

Macdonald was a no-nonsense referee who was not averse to sending off players for violent play or dissent, including Craig Young, Johnny Greaves and Ron Raper, Steve Kneen, Kevin Ryan, Paul Sait, Graham Olling and Bill Ashurst.

Macdonald was also involved in some volatile situations after matches, being pelted with fruit and cans by irate spectators, and doused with beer.

After he retired from refereeing, Macdonald was elected as President of the NSWRL Referees Association from 1980 to 1984. He also served on the Referees Examination Board for a number of years.

Macdonald was awarded Life Membership of the NSWRL Referees Association in 1976.

External links
Macdonald referees Western Suburbs V Canterbury-Bankstown on 29 April 1978

References

External links
Don Macdonald career summary at Rugby League Project

 

Year of birth missing
1994 deaths
People from New South Wales
Australian rugby league referees
Rugby league referees from Newtown